Sarcohyla crassa is a species of frog in the family Hylidae. It is endemic to the Sierra Madre de Oaxaca of Oaxaca, Mexico. It is also known as the aquatic treefrog, or when referring to the former Hyla bogertae, Bogert's aquatic treefrog.

It is threatened by the loss of original montane forests and possibly chytridiomycosis.

References

crassa
Endemic amphibians of Mexico
Fauna of the Sierra Madre de Oaxaca
Taxa named by Paul Brocchi
Amphibians described in 1877
Taxonomy articles created by Polbot